Mundesley railway station was a former station on the Norfolk and Suffolk Joint Railway in Mundesley, Norfolk. It opened on 1 July 1898.

The station was host to a LNER camping coach from 1938 to 1939. Two coaches were positioned here by Eastern Region of British Railways in 1952, then four coaches from 1953 to 1958, then ten for 1959 reducing to six coaches from 1960 to 1964, 3 coaches remained for the 1965 season despite the station having closed.

On 7 April 1953 the station became the terminus of the line from North Walsham when the route to Cromer closed. In 1964 the remainder of the route was closed.

References

External links
 Mundesley station on 1946 O. S. map

Mundesley
Disused railway stations in Norfolk
Former Norfolk and Suffolk Joint Railway stations
Railway stations in Great Britain opened in 1898
Railway stations in Great Britain closed in 1964
Beeching closures in England